The 2007 Christchurch Borough Council election took place on 3 May 2007 to elect members of Christchurch Borough Council in Dorset, England. The whole council was up for election and the Conservative party stayed in overall control of the council.

Background
After the last election in 2003 the Conservatives had a majority on the council with 14 councillors, compared to 8 for the Liberal Democrats and 2 independents. This majority increased when both of the Liberal Democrat councillors for Portfield, Susan Darch and Lillian Jefferis, defected to the Conservatives. However the Liberal Democrats regained one of the seats in a by-election on 5 May 2005 after the resignation of Susan Darch from the council and at the same time picked up a seat in Jumpers ward, which had formerly been held by an independent councillor.

63 candidates stood in 2007 for the 24 seats on the council, with Conservative candidates for every seat. The Liberal Democrats had 19 candidates, with at least one in all 11 wards, while six independents stood for election. After 16 years without a seat on the council, Labour stood 11 candidates in 2007, one in each ward, and the UK Independence Party had three candidates.

Only one councillor stood down at the election, Kevin Dingley from North Highcliffe and Walkford ward.

Election result
The Conservatives majority on the council was strengthened after they won 17 of the 24 seats on the council. This was at the expense of the Liberal Democrats who lost half of their seats on the council to fall to four councillors. Meanwhile, independents picked up two seats to have three councillors.

The Conservatives gained seats from the Liberal Democrats in Purewell and Stanpit, but they did lose a seat back in Portfield. In Jumpers ward, independent Fred Neale picked up a seat, while independent Julie Petrie also gained a seat, topping the poll in Grange ward. The second seat in Grange had Conservative Denise Jones and Liberal Democrat John Freeman both finish with 374 votes. The winner of this seat was chosen by drawing a name out of a hat and Conservative Denise Jones gained the seat from the Liberal Democrat after she was given one more vote, as her name was chosen.

Ward results

By-elections between 2007 and 2011
A by-election was held in Portfield on 16 July 2009 after the resignation of Liberal Democrat councillor David Vick due to poor health. The seat was held for the Liberal Democrats by Christine Payne with a one-vote majority over Conservative Lisle Smith.

References

2007
2007 English local elections